Allah Valley Airport  is an airport serving the general area of Allah Valley, located in the province of South Cotabato in the Philippines. There are currently no scheduled flights serving this airport.

Although the airport is officially named "Allah Valley Airport" by the Civil Aviation Authority of the Philippines, some sources use the name "Alah Airport", although this is unofficial.

The airport is classified by the Civil Aviation Authority of the Philippines as a community airport.

See also
List of airports in the Philippines

References

Airports in the Philippines
Buildings and structures in South Cotabato
Transportation in Mindanao